Gurgureyevo (Görgöröy) is a rural locality (a village) in Sharipovsky Selsoviet, Kushnarenkovsky District, Bashkortostan, Russia. The population was 145 as of 2010. There are 5 streets.

Geography 
Gurgureyevo is located 18 km south of Kushnarenkovo (the district's administrative centre) by road. Novye Tukmakly is the nearest rural locality.

References 

Rural localities in Kushnarenkovsky District